Timba is a village in Satlasana Taluka in Mahesana district of Gujarat, India.

References

Villages in Mehsana district